The Safari Club was a covert alliance of intelligence services formed in 1976 that ran clandestine operations around Africa at a time when the United States Congress had limited the power of the CIA after years of abuses and when Portugal was dismantling its colonial empire in Africa. Its formal members were the pre-revolution (Pahlavi) Iran, Egypt, Saudi Arabia, Morocco and France. The group maintained informal connections with the United States, South Africa, Rhodesia and Israel. The group executed a successful military intervention in Zaire in response to an invasion from Angola. It also provided arms to Somalia in its 1977–1978 conflict with Ethiopia. It organized secret diplomacy relating to anti-Communism in Africa, and has been credited with initiating the process resulting in the 1979 Egypt–Israel peace treaty.

Organization
Alexandre de Marenches initiated the pact with messages to the four other countries—and to newly independent Algeria, which declined to participate.

The original charter was signed in 1976 by leaders and intelligence directors from the five countries:

 France – Alexandre de Marenches, Director of the Service de Documentation Extérieure et de Contre-Espionnage (SDECE), the external intelligence agency
 Saudi Arabia – Kamal Adham, Director of Intelligence Al Mukhabarat Al A'amah
 Egypt – General Kamal Hassan Ali, Director of the Intelligence Mukhabarat
 Morocco – General Ahmed Dlimi, Director of Intelligence and commander of the Royal Moroccan Army
 Iran – General Nematollah Nassiri of SAVAK (Iranian Intelligence)  

The charter begins: "Recent events in Angola and other parts of Africa have demonstrated the continent's role as a theatre for revolutionary wars prompted and conducted by the Soviet Union, which utilizes individuals or organizations sympathetic to, or controlled by, Marxist ideology."

The group's purpose was therefore to oppose Soviet influence by supporting anti-Communists. The charter also says that the group intends to be "global in conception". Its formation has been attributed to interlocking interests of the countries involved (which were already cooperating to some degree). Alongside ideological pursuit of global anti-Communism, these included the more concrete goals of military strategy and economic interests. (Examples include international mining operations and investments in apartheid South Africa's Transvaal Development Company.)

Infrastructure

The Safari Club takes its name (reportedly de Marenches' idea) after the exclusive resort in Kenya where the group first met in 1976. The club was operated by Saudi arms dealer Adnan Khashoggi—also a friend of Adham's.

The original charter establishes that an operations centre would be built by 1 September 1976 in Cairo. The group made its headquarters there, and its organization included a secretariat, a planning wing, and an operations wing. Meetings were also held in Saudi Arabia and in Egypt. The group made large purchases of real estate and secure communications equipment.

The creation of the Safari Club coincided with the consolidation of the Bank of Credit and Commerce International (BCCI). The BCCI served to launder money, particularly for Saudi Arabia and the United States—whose CIA director in 1976, George H. W. Bush, had a personal account. "The Safari Club needed a network of banks to finance its intelligence operations. With the official blessing of George Bush as the head of the CIA, Adham transformed a small Pakistani merchant bank, the Bank of Credit and Commerce International (BCCI), into a worldwide money-laundering machine, buying banks around the world in order to create the biggest clandestine money network in history."

BCCI also served as an intelligence gathering mechanism by virtue of its extensive contacts with underground organizations worldwide. "They contrived, with Bush and other intelligence-service heads, a plan that seemed too good to be true. The bank would solicit the business of every major terrorist, rebel, and underground organization in the world. The invaluable intelligence thus gained would be discreetly distributed to 'friends' of the BCCI."

United States involvement
The United States was not a formal member of the group, but was involved to some degree, particularly through its Central Intelligence Agency. Henry Kissinger is credited with the American strategy of supporting the Safari Club implicitly — allowing it to fulfill American objectives by proxy without risking direct responsibility. This function became particularly important after the U.S. Congress passed the War Powers Resolution in 1973 and the Clark Amendment in 1976, reacting against covert military actions orchestrated within the government's Executive branch.

An important factor in the nature of U.S. involvement concerned changing domestic perceptions of the CIA and government secrecy. The Rockefeller Commission and the Church Committee had recently launched investigations that revealed decades of illegal operations by the CIA and the FBI. The Watergate scandal directed media attention at these secret operations served as a proximate cause for these ongoing investigations. Jimmy Carter discussed public concerns over secrecy in his campaign, and when he took office in January 1977 he attempted to reduce the scope of covert CIA operations. In a 2002 speech at Georgetown University, Prince Turki of the Saudi Arabian intelligence service described the situation like so:

In 1976, after the Watergate matters took place here, your intelligence community was literally tied up by Congress. It could not do anything. It could not send spies, it could not write reports, and it could not pay money. In order to compensate for that, a group of countries got together in the hope of fighting Communism and established what was called the Safari Club. The Safari Club included France, Egypt, Saudi Arabia, Morocco and Iran. The principal aim of this club was that we would share information with each other and help each other in countering Soviet influence worldwide, and especially in Africa.

As the Safari Club was beginning operations, former CIA Director Richard Helms and agent Theodore "Ted" Shackley were under scrutiny from Congress and feared that new covert operations could be quickly exposed. Peter Dale Scott has classified the Safari Club as part of the "second CIA" — an extension of the organization's reach maintained by an autonomous group of key agents. Thus even as Carter's new CIA director Stansfield Turner attempted to limit the scope of the agency's operations, Shackley, his deputy Thomas Clines, and agent Edwin P. Wilson secretly maintained their connections with the Safari Club and the BCCI.

Undercover operations without congressional oversight
The Safari Club used an informal division of labor in conducting its global operations. Saudi Arabia provided money, France provided high-end technology, and Egypt and Morocco supplied weapons and troops. The Safari Club typically coordinated with American and Israeli intelligence agencies.

Debut: Shaba Province of Zaire 

The Safari Club's first action came in March–April 1977, in response to the Shaba I conflict in Zaire after a call for support was made in the interest of protecting the French and Belgian mining operations in the country. The Safari Club answered and came to the aid of Zaire—led by the Western-backed and anti-Communist Mobutu—in repelling an invasion by the Front for the National Liberation of the Congo (FNLC). France airlifted Moroccan and Egyptian troops into Shaba province and successfully repelled the attackers. Belgium and the United States also provided material support. The Shaba conflict served as a front in the Angolan Civil War and also helped to defend French and Belgian mining interests in the Congo.

The Safari Club ultimately provided US$5 million in assistance for Jonas Savimbi's National Union for the Total Independence of Angola (UNITA).

Egypt–Israel peace talks
The group helped to mediate talks between Egypt and Israel, leading to Sadat's visit to Jerusalem in 1977, the Camp David Accords in 1978, and the Egypt–Israel peace treaty in 1979. This process began with a Moroccan member of the Safari Club personally transporting a letter from Yitzhak Rabin to Sadat (and reportedly warning him of a Libyan assassination plot); this message was followed by secret talks in Morocco—supervised by King Hassan II—with Israeli general Moshe Dayan, Mossad director Yitzhak Hofi and Egyptian intelligence agent Hassan Tuhami. Immediately after CIA Director Stansfield Turner told an Israeli delegation that the CIA would no longer provide special favors to Israel, Shackley (who remained active in the Safari Club) contacted Mossad and presented himself as their CIA contact.<ref>Trento, Prelude to Terror (2005), p. 110. "According to Crowley, Shackley 'went out, dropped a quarter in the telephone, and contacted Mossad. He went around Turner and contacted Mossad and said he would be their man in the Agency. Shackley moved quickly to fill the Angleton void."</ref>

Ethiopia and Somalia

The Safari Club backed Somalia in the 1977–1978 Ethio-Somali War after Cuba and the USSR sided with Ethiopia. This conflict erupted when Somalia attempted to gain control over the (ethnically Somali) Ogaden region of Ethiopia. Prior to the war, the USSR had supported both states militarily. After failing to negotiate a ceasefire, the USSR intervened to defend Ethiopia. The Soviet-backed Ethiopian forces—supported by more than ten thousand troops from Cuba, more than one thousand military advisors, and about $1 billion worth of Soviet armaments—defeated the Somali army and threatened a counter-attack. The Safari Club approached Somali leader Siad Barre and offered arms in exchange for repudiating the Soviet Union. Barre agreed, and Saudi Arabia paid Egypt $75 million for its older Soviet weapons. Iran supplied old weapons (reportedly including M-48 tanks) from the U.S.Lefebvre, Arms for the Horn (1992), p. 188. "Washington had done little to control, and seemingly had encouraged, Egypt, Iran, and Saudi Arabia to take advantage of the more liberal policies of other Western states and make third-party arms transfers to Somalia. Reports surfaced that U.S.-made M-48 tanks, originally sold to Iran, had reached Somalia by way of Oman."

The events of Somalia brought unique divergence between the official policies of the U.S. and the Safari Club.  Carter, perturbed by Somalia's unexpected aggressiveness, decided against publicly backing Somalia, and the shah of Iran was forced to deliver the message from Carter that "You Somalis are threatening to upset the balance of world power."Miglietta, American Alliance Policy (2002), p. 78. "This led the Red Sea Entente countries of Saudi Arabia and Iran, as well as Somalia, to view Washington as having let them down and backing away from its commitments at the last moment." But on 22 August 1980, Carter's Department of State announced a broad plan for military development in Somalia, including construction of a base as well as economic and military aid to the Somali army. This policy would continue into the Reagan administration.

Arming and funding the Mujahideen
Safari Club members, the BCCI, and the United States cooperated in arming and funding the Afghan mujahideen to oppose the Soviet Union. The core of this plan was an agreement between the United States and Saudi Arabia to match each other in funding Afghan resistance to the USSR. Like military support for Somalia, this policy began in 1980 and continued into the Reagan administration.

Further developments

The Safari Club could not continue as it was when the 1978–1979 Iranian Revolution neutralized the Shah as an ally. However, arrangements between the remaining powers continued on the same course. William Casey, Ronald Reagan's campaign manager, succeeded Turner as director of the CIA. Casey took personal responsibility for maintaining contacts with Saudi intelligence, meeting monthly with Kamal Adham and then Prince Turki. Some of the same actors were later connected to the Iran–Contra affair.

The existence of the Safari Club was discovered by the Egyptian journalist Mohamed Hassanein Heikal, who was permitted to review documents confiscated during the Iranian Revolution.Mamdani, Good Muslim, Bad Muslim (2004), p. 84. "The existence of the club came to light after the 1979 Iranian Revolution when Mohamed Heikal, a highly respected Egyptian journalist and onetime advisor to President Nasser, was given permission by the new Khomeni government to go through the deposed Shah's archives. Heikal came upon an agreement setting up a formal association, dated September 1, 1976, and signed by the heads of several intelligence agencies, all strategic allies of the United States in the Cold War.

See also
 Foreign relations of South Africa during apartheid
 Halloween Massacre
 Le Cercle 
 Operation Condor, a similar covert anti-communist alliance of South American intelligence services.

References

Sources
Bronson, Rachel. Thicker than Oil: Oil:America's Uneasy Partnership with Saudi Arabia. Oxford University Press, 2006. 
Heikal, Mohamed. Iran: The Untold Story: An Insider's Account of America's Iranian Adventure and Its Consequences for the Future. New York: Pantheon, 1982. 
Cooley, John. Unholy Wars: Afghanistan, America and International Terrorism. London: Pluto Press, 1999; 3rd edition, 2002. 
Lefebvre, Jeffrey A. Arms for the Horn: U.S. Security Policy in Ethiopia and Somalia, 1953–1991. University of Pittsburgh Press, 1992.  
Mamdani, Mahmood. Good Muslim, Bad Muslim: America, the Cold War, and the Roots of Terrorism. New York: Pantheon, 2004. 
Miglietta, John P. American Alliance Policy in the Middle East, 1945-1992: Iran, Israel, and Saudi Arabia. Lanham, MD: Lexington Books, 2002. 
Scott, Peter Dale. The Road to 9/11: Wealth, Empire, and the Future of America. University of California Press, 2008. 
 Scott, Peter Dale. American War Machine: Deep Politics, the CIA Global Drug Connection, and the Road to Afghanistan. Blue Ridge Summit, PA: Rowman & Littlefield, 2010. 
Trento, Joseph J. Prelude to Terror: Edwin P. Wilson and the Legacy of America's Private Intelligence Network''. New York: Carroll & Graf (Avalon), 2005. 

Cold War organizations
Covert organizations
Directorate-General for External Security
Intelligence operations
International military organizations
Military alliances involving Egypt
Military alliances involving France
Military alliances involving Saudi Arabia
Military alliances involving Morocco
Military alliances involving Iran
Anti-communist organizations
French intelligence operations